Alberto Cuello (born 23 September 1909, date of death unknown) was an Argentine footballer. He played in five matches for the Argentina national football team from 1930 to 1937. He was also part of Argentina's squad for the 1937 South American Championship.

References

External links
 

1909 births
Year of death missing
Argentine footballers
Argentina international footballers
Place of birth missing
Association football defenders
Club Atlético Tigre footballers
Club Atlético River Plate footballers